Scream is a 1996 American slasher film directed by Wes Craven and written by Kevin Williamson. The film stars David Arquette, Neve Campbell, Courteney Cox, Matthew Lillard, Rose McGowan, Skeet Ulrich, and Drew Barrymore. Released on December 20, it follows high school student Sidney Prescott (Campbell) and her group of friends in the fictional town of Woodsboro, California, who become the targets of a mysterious killer in a Halloween costume known as Ghostface. The film satirizes the clichés of the slasher genre popularized in films such as Halloween (1978), Friday the 13th (1980), and Craven's own A Nightmare on Elm Street (1984). Scream was considered unique at the time of its release for featuring characters aware of real-world horror films who openly discussed the clichés that the film attempted to subvert.

Inspired by the real-life case of the Gainesville Ripper, Scream was influenced by Williamson's passion for horror films, especially Halloween (1978). The screenplay, originally titled Scary Movie, was bought by Dimension Films and was retitled by the Weinstein brothers just before filming was complete. The production faced censorship issues with the Motion Picture Association of America and obstacles from locals while filming on location. The film received positive reviews and was a financial success, earning $173million worldwide, becoming the highest-grossing slasher film until the release of Halloween (2018). It still remains the highest-grossing slasher film in adjusted dollars. It received several awards and award nominations. The soundtrack by Marco Beltrami was also acclaimed, and was cited as "[one] of the most intriguing horror scores composed in years". The score has since earned "cult status". Scream marked a change in the genre as it cast already-established and successful actors, which was considered to have helped it find a wider audience, including a significant female viewership.

Scream was credited with revitalizing the slasher genre in the 1990s, which was considered to be almost dead following an influx of direct-to-video titles and numerous sequels to established horror franchises of the 1970s and 1980s. Screams success spawned a series of sequels, beginning with Scream 2 (1997).

Plot 

High school student Casey Becker is home alone when she receives a phone call from an unknown person, during which they discuss horror movies. The caller turns sadistic, harassing Casey and threatening her life. He reveals that her boyfriend Steve Orth is bound and gagged outside on her patio and demands she answer questions about horror films correctly in exchange for his survival. After Casey answers a question about Friday the 13th incorrectly, Steve is murdered in front of her. Refusing to answer any further questions, Casey attempts to escape, but is cornered by someone wearing a "Ghostface" costume, who kills her before her parents arrive home to find her disemboweled corpse hanging from a tree.

News media descend on the town in the wake of the murders and a police investigation begins. Teenager Sidney Prescott struggles with the upcoming first anniversary of her mother Maureen's rape and murder, while a news reporter, Gale Weathers, whom Sidney despises, arrives as a press member. Gale was responsible for spreading rumors and conspiracy theories about Maureen's death, insinuating that the imprisoned Cotton Weary, who was tried and convicted of Maureen's rape and murder, was not responsible for the crime. That night, while waiting at home for her best friend Tatum Riley's arrival, Sidney gets a taunting phone call and is attacked by Ghostface. Sidney's boyfriend Billy Loomis arrives immediately after the killer flees. When he drops his cell phone, Sidney suspects him of making the call and runs off. Billy is placed under police custody, but later, at Tatum's house, Sidney receives another ominous call.

The next day, Billy is released and suspicion shifts to Sidney's father Neil Prescott, due to the phone calls having been traced to his phone. After school is suspended in wake of the murders, Ghostface ambushes Principal Arthur Himbry and stabs him to death. Tatum's boyfriend and Billy's best friend, Stu Macher, throws a party to celebrate the school's closure. Gale attends uninvited, as she expects Ghostface to strike again. Tatum's older brother, Deputy Dewey Riley, is also there on duty. Tatum heads to the garage to collect beers, where she is cornered by Ghostface, who crushes her neck with the garage door when she attempts to escape through its pet door. Many party attendees are drawn away after hearing of Himbry's death, leaving only Sidney, Billy, Stu, their friend Randy Meeks, and Gale's cameraman Kenny.

After having sex, Sidney and Billy are confronted by Ghostface, who stabs Billy. Sidney escapes from the house and seeks help from Kenny, who is killed by Ghostface. Gale crashes her van while escaping and Dewey is stabbed in the back while investigating in the house, with Sidney taking his gun for protection. Randy and Stu show up and accuse each other of being the killer, but Sidney retreats back into the house where she finds a wounded Billy. After they let Randy inside, Sidney gives Billy the gun, who in turn shoots Randy, revealing himself as the killer. Stu is revealed to be his accomplice by talking into a voice changer.

Billy and Stu corner Sidney in the kitchen and discuss their plan to kill her and pin the murder spree on her father, whom they have taken hostage. They also reveal that they murdered her mother and framed Cotton for it, as she was having an affair with Billy's father, which drove his mother away. Gale intervenes, enabling Sidney to escape and turn the tables on the killers, taunting them with a phone call and donning the Ghostface costume, before knocking Billy out and killing Stu by dropping a television set on his head. An enraged Billy awakens and attacks Sidney, but Gale shoots him. Randy, wounded but alive, remarks that the killer always resurfaces for one last scare. As Billy rises, Sidney shoots him in the head, finally killing him. As police arrive, Dewey, badly injured, is transported to an ambulance as Gale makes an impromptu news report about the night's events.

Cast

Production

Writing 
Scream was originally developed under the title Scary Movie by Kevin Williamson, an aspiring screenwriter. Influenced by a news story he was watching about a series of grisly murders by the Gainesville Ripper, Williamson became concerned about intruders upon finding an open window in the house where he was staying. He was inspired to draft an 18-page script treatment about a young woman, alone in a house, who is taunted over the phone and then attacked by a masked killer. The treatment remained as a short story while Williamson worked on another script, Teaching Mrs. Tingle, a thriller that he would eventually sell but that would languish in development hell for many years. Struggling to pay his bills, Williamson secluded himself in Palm Springs and focused on the development of his Scary Movie treatment, hoping for a quick sale to meet his financial needs. Over the course of three days, Williamson developed a full-length script as well as two separate five-page outlines for potential sequels—Scary Movie 2 and Scary Movie 3. He hoped to entice buyers with the potential for a franchise. In an interview, Williamson said that one reason he focused on the Scary Movie script was because it was a film he wanted to watch, born of his childhood love of horror films such as Halloween, but "nobody else [was] making it". His appreciation for previous horror films became evident in the script, which was inspired by and references films such as Halloween (1978), When a Stranger Calls (1979), Friday the 13th (1980), Prom Night (1980), and A Nightmare on Elm Street (1984). Williamson listened to the soundtrack of Halloween for inspiration while writing the script. Excerpts from the soundtrack appear in the film.

By June 1995 Williamson brought the Scary Movie script to his agent, Rob Paris, to put out for sale. Paris warned him that the level of violence and gore in his script would make it "impossible" to sell. Following the script's purchase by Miramax, Williamson was required to remove much of the gorier content, such as graphic depictions of the internal organs of gutted murder victims "rolling" down their legs. However, once Craven was secured as director, he was able to bring much of the excised content back. Williamson was going to remove a scene in the school bathroom featuring Sidney, as he felt it was awkward and out of place in the film. Craven insisted the scene should remain, as he felt it developed the character and her relationship with her deceased mother. Williamson later confirmed that he was glad that Craven proved him wrong about the scene.

Dimension Films head Bob Weinstein realized while reviewing the script that there were thirty pages (approximately thirty on-screen minutes) without a murder, so he instructed Williamson to have another character killed. Williamson included the death of the character Principal Himbry (Winkler) based on this input and in doing so inadvertently resolved a problem in the script's finale. Williamson had struggled to find a reason for several extraneous characters to leave a party scene so that the killer could attack, finally determining that the announcement of the discovery of Himbry's corpse would serve to remove the non-essential characters, who decide to take a look at the corpse and leave the party before (and enabling) the start of the murders. Concerning the killers' motives, Williamson felt it was essential for the audience to learn why the antagonists had become killers, but he also felt it was potentially scarier if they had no motivation. Opinions at the studio were split between those who believed a motive was needed for resolution and those who felt the action was scarier without one. As there were two killers, Williamson decided to do both: Billy Loomis had the motive of maternal abandonment, while the second killer, Stu Macher, jokingly suggests "peer pressure" as his motive when prompted.

Development 
The script for what was then known as Scary Movie went on sale on a Friday in June 1995, but received no bids. By the following Monday, the script had become the subject of a significant bidding war among a host of established studios, including Paramount Pictures, Universal Pictures, and Morgan Creek Productions. Producer Cathy Konrad read the script and felt it was exactly what the Weinstein brothers of the fledgling Dimension Filmsthen a part of Miramaxwere looking for. Dimension had previously released several horror films and intended to focus on that genre. Konrad brought the script to Bob Weinstein's assistant, Richard Potter. Believing it had potential, he brought it to Weinstein's attention. Studios began to drop out of the bidding as the price of the script increased, and the final two bidders were Oliver Stone, who was at the time working under Cinergi Pictures, and the Weinsteins of Dimension Films. Williamson agreed to a bid of $400,000 from Miramax, plus a contract for two sequels and a possible fourth unrelated film. Williamson said he chose Dimension because he believed they would produce Scary Movie immediately and without significantly censoring the violence in the script. Craven read the script before he became involved in the production, and considered convincing a studio to buy it for him to direct. However, by the time Craven read the script, it had already been sold.

Bob Weinstein approached Craven early in the planning stages, because he felt Craven's previous work in the genre that combined horror and comedy would make him the perfect person to bring Williamson's script to screen. Craven was already busy developing a remake of The Haunting and was considering distancing himself from the horror genre. He was growing weary of what he felt was an inherent misogyny and violence in it. Weinstein approached other directors, including Robert Rodriguez, Quentin Tarantino, Danny Boyle, Tom McLoughlin, George A. Romero, and Sam Raimi. Williamson said they "didn't get it"; he was concerned that having read the script, many of the directors believed the film to be purely a comedy. Craven was approached again but continued to pass in spite of repeated requests. When production of The Haunting collapsed, Craven was freed from that commitment and found himself in need of a project. Meanwhile, Drew Barrymore had signed on to the film at her own request. When he heard an established actress wanted to be involved, Craven reasoned that Scary Movie might be different from other films of the genre he had previously undertaken, and he contacted Weinstein to accept the job. Craven was committed to keeping the film's title Scary Movie.

As the film neared completion, the Weinstein brothers changed the film's title from Scary Movie to Scream. They were inspired by the Michael Jackson song of the same name. Bob Weinstein considered Scary Movie to be an unsuitable title as, in addition to the horror and violence, the film contained elements of satire and comedy; Weinstein wished for that to be better conveyed by the title. The change was effected so late into production that congratulatory gifts bore the original name. Williamson and Craven immediately disliked the new title, and considered it "stupid". Both later remarked that the change turned out to be positive, and that Weinstein had been wise to pick the new title. Following a screening of the film in front of a test audience and Miramax executives, Craven was offered a two-picture contract for sequels to Scream.

Sony Pictures filed a lawsuit against Dimension Films and Miramax, claiming that the title "Scream" infringed on the copyright of Sony's own Screamers (1995), released the previous year. After the case was settled out of court—the details remain confidential—Scream 2 producer Marianne Maddalena considered that the case was a result of other issues between the two companies and did not truly pertain to the film's moniker. Maddalena confirmed that the studio was free to use the Scream brand for future films.

Casting 
Scream was a turning point in terms of casting for the horror genre, which normally involved relatively unknown actors. The genre was considered unsuitable for bigger names as the films had lower budgets and often attained negative critical response. Drew Barrymore read the script and was interested in being involved. She approached the production team herself to request a role. Barrymore, a member of the Barrymore family of actors and granddaughter of actor John Barrymore, had become a star in her own right following her appearance in E.T. the Extra-Terrestrial (1982). The producers were quick to take advantage of her unexpected interest, and signed her to play the lead role of Sidney Prescott. Her involvement was believed to be instrumental in attracting other popular actors to the film in spite of its smaller budget, and in causing Craven to reconsider his decision to direct the film. Before filming began, Barrymore was faced with unexpected commitments that meant she would no longer be available to play the lead role. She instead played the smaller role of Casey Becker, which allowed her to remain involved and still gave the production the advantage of her stature. Killing off one of their biggest stars early in the film was considered a calculated risk, but it was believed that it would be so shocking and unexpected that audiences would then believe that any character could die. Craven had seen Neve Campbell in the television series Party of Five and asked her to audition for the part of Sidney. He believed she could play a character who was "innocent", but who could also realistically handle herself while dealing with the physical conflict and emotions required by the role. Campbell was initially reluctant to star in another horror film so soon after her supporting role in The Craft (1996), but after a successful audition, she accepted an offer to play Sidney. She signed on because Scream would be her first leading role and because she adored the character, saying "She's a fantastic character for any kind of movie."

For the role of news reporter Gale Weathers, the studio wanted a recognizable actress. They auditioned Brooke Shields and Janeane Garofalo. Courteney Cox, who was starring in the sitcom Friends at the time, approached the production to pursue the role. She was interested in playing a "bitch" character to offset her "nice" Friends image. This image was the main reason why the producers initially refused to consider her for the part, but Cox continued to lobby the studio as she felt she could believably play the character; her efforts ultimately succeeded. Rose McGowan was cast as Tatum Riley: the casting director believed she best embodied the "spunky", "cynical" yet "innocent" nature of the character. The studio felt the strong female cast of Campbell, Barrymore, Cox, and McGowan would help draw a significant female audience to the film.

Skeet Ulrich was cast in the role of Sidney's boyfriend Billy Loomis. The producers viewed him as "perfect" for the part and noted his resemblance to a young Johnny Depp who appeared in A Nightmare on Elm Street, one of the many films referenced in Scream. Ulrich and Campbell had previously worked together on The Craft and believed their experience on that film helped them be more comfortable with each other, which proved conducive to a more natural portrayal of their characters' relationship. David Arquette was also approached for the role of Billy, but he asked to read for the part of Dewey Riley after reading the script. The role, described as "hunky", was considered ill-fitting for Arquette's lean, slender appearance and approach but Arquette was still allowed to audition for the part. Craven appreciated his softer, funnier approach to the character, and gave him the role. Matthew Lillard was cast as Billy's equally sadistic friend Stu Macher by chance after accompanying his then-girlfriend to an unrelated audition taking place elsewhere in the same building. Casting director Lisa Beach saw Lillard in the hallway and asked him to audition for the part. He got into the role with "incredible ferocity". Lillard would later confirm that he initially was supposed to audition for the part of Billy, but he was eventually persuaded to come back and audition for Stu instead. The role of Randy Meeks was contested between Jamie Kennedy and Breckin Meyer. The producers favored Kennedy, believing him to best embody the part. As he had no major roles prior to Scream, the studio wanted a more prominent actor than Kennedy to play Randy. The producers were adamant that he was the best choice and successfully fought to keep him. According to Kennedy, Jason Lee and Seth Green were in the running for the role as well. Roger L. Jackson, voice of the character Ghostface, was picked at the end of several weeks of local casting in Santa Rosa, where parts of Scream were filmed. The producers had originally intended to use his voice only as a placeholder, dubbing over it during post-production. They decided that Jackson's contribution was perfect and kept it. Craven described it as an "intelligent" and "evil" voice that would become irreplaceable to the series. To aid their performances, Jackson was never allowed to meet the other actors, preventing them from associating a face with the menacing voice. Jackson was present on the set and spoke to actors by phone to help aid their performances.

The cast was rounded out by W. Earl Brown, who played Gale Weathers' cameraman Kenny; Joseph Whipp, who played Sheriff Burke; Lawrence Hecht as Neil Prescott (Sidney's father); and C.W. Morgan as Hank Loomis (Billy's father). Liev Schreiber appeared in a minor role as Cotton Weary, the framed killer of Sidney's mother, and Linda Blair made a brief cameo as a TV reporter outside the school. Henry Winkler appeared as Principal Himbry, an aggressive school principal. Winkler remained uncredited so as to not draw attention away from the young main cast.

Filming 

Principal photography for Scream took place over eight weeks between April 15 and June 8, 1996, on a budget of $15million. The Weinsteins wanted to film in Vancouver as it was estimated that they could save $1million in costs compared to shooting in the United States. Craven was adamant about filming in the United States, and making a film that looked "truly American". The argument over where to film almost led to Craven being removed from the project, but the Weinsteins eventually agreed to keep the production in America. Location scouts looked at North Carolina as a possibility, but found that sites that seemed appropriate for the film's requirements would have required extensive building, repairs, or modification, which would have inflated costs.

Attention was next turned towards California; scouts discovered Sonoma County and the cities of Santa Rosa, Healdsburg, and the nearby Tomales Bay. The house of Barrymore's character is situated southeast of Santa Rosa on Sonoma Mountain Road, directly facing the house used in the horror film Cujo (1983). The home of Sidney Prescott is located near Calistoga, north of Santa Rosa. Tatum's home is situated on McDonald Avenue in Santa Rosa, next to the houses used in Pollyanna (1960) and Shadow of a Doubt (1943). The home of Lillard's character, which is the location for the entire third act, is a house on Tomales Road east of Tomales Bay that had only recently become available after the death of its owners. The Woodsboro town square, including the fountain where many of the cast sit in an early scene, is represented by the Healdsburg town square.

For the Woodsboro high school, Craven desired a building that looked "American", and the producers approached Santa Rosa High School. The school board insisted on seeing the script and immediately objected to the violence against teenage children and the cynical, dark dialogue, including that of the fictional school principal. Local newspapers criticized the project, and irate parents objected to such a film taking place at their children's school. Comparisons were made between film violence and the kidnap and murder of Polly Klaas three years prior, which had left the area sensitized toward violence. The producers received support from the school's students and some local residents, who recognized that economic benefits would be generated by the film's presence. Others argued for the film's First Amendment rights. The dispute resulted in a three-hour debate scheduled for April 16, one day after filming was to begin. Unwilling to be delayed, Craven began filming as scheduled on the 15th. He started with the opening scene of the film, which features Barrymore; the scene took five days to complete. The result of the Santa Rosa debate was that permission would be denied. The production was forced to find another location for the school, and ended up filming at the Sonoma Community Center, southeast of Santa Rosa.

The progress of filming was criticized early on. Bob Weinstein disliked the Ghostface mask, believing it was not "scary". Upon reviewing the dailies footage of the opening scene, the studio was concerned that the film was progressing in an unwanted direction. They considered replacing Craven. To assuage their concerns, Craven and editor Patrick Lussier developed a rough workprint version of the opening 13 minutes of the film to demonstrate how the completed film might turn out. After viewing the new footage, the studio was content to let Craven continue as director. Weinstein, having seen the mask in action, was satisfied that it could be scary. The third and final act of the film, over forty minutes long, is set at a house party where Ghostface strikes. It was shot at a vacant property in Tomales over 21 nights. The scene, labeled "Scene 118", was considered the most difficult to shoot as it took place entirely in one location yet featured the individual stories and deaths of multiple characters. Actors spent weeks undertaking intense emotional and physical scenes while coated in fake blood and wounds. As the scene was set during the evening, production had no choice but to halt at dawn.

Director of photography Mark Irwin was fired during filming of Screams finale, a week before principal photography was to be completed. Upon review of the dailies, Craven found the footage was out of focus and unusable. Irwin was initially ordered to fire his camera crew. He retorted that if his crew were to be fired, they would also have to fire him. The producers fired him and replaced him with Peter Deming, who finished the film.

Special effects and design 

To produce the many grisly effects for the film, the producers recruited KNB Effects team Howard Berger, Robert Kurtzman, and Gregory Nicotero. One of their first tasks was the production of a mask for the film's killer. In his script, Williamson had only described the antagonist as a "masked killer", which gave Craven no specific information on what type of mask to use or how to conceal the body. While location scouting, Maddalena discovered the Ghostface mask hanging from a post inside the house previously used for the film Shadow of a Doubt. Craven wanted to use it, but the mask design was owned by Fun World, a costume company. He was told to create one that the production could own. KNB developed multiple design sketches varying from deformed faces to monstrous visages riddled with fangs. Craven found nothing like the Ghostface design, so he had KNB develop a mask that was based on it, with enough differences to avoid any claim of copyright. The team developed several molds based on the Ghostface design, but Craven found none were as suitable as the mask he wanted to use. Desperate to use the design, Craven finally convinced the studio to approach Fun World and gained permission to use the mask. While negotiations were in progress, he had KNB make a mask that was very similar to the original mask, but was appropriate for use in filming. The mask they produced, made of a thin foam, was used in two scenes of the film: the opening scene with Barrymore's character and the murder of Principal Himbry. Craven disliked the mask due to its slight differences from the original, and thus used the Fun World design for the rest of filming.

KNB Effects created over 50 gallons of fake blood, normally composed of corn syrup and food dye, to create the special effect of severe wounds. For the penetrating effect of knives, the production used collapsible blades to prevent injury. An umbrella with a retractable tip is used as a stabbing weapon in the finale. Ulrich wore a protective vest beneath his shirt to help prevent harm while a stuntwoman attacked him with it. The second thrust missed the vest and stabbed Ulrich on his chest, impacting a wound from an open heart surgery operation. Ulrich's genuine pain was captured on film and used in the release version of Scream.

Two of the most complex special effects in the film were the corpses of Barrymore's and Walls' characters, Casey Becker and Steve Orth. Their deaths involved the character being gutted from ribcage to pelvis, essentially hollowing out the torso of internal organs, with the guts "rolling" from the wound. To allow Walls to continue to move and feign death while displaying the wound, KNB designed a chair with no back. The actor would kneel behind it while his upper body, head, and arms were positioned within the chair's seating area. An anatomical model representing the character's torso and legs was positioned in the chair and disguised so that the actor's upper body and the model appeared to be one piece. The fake abdomen was filled with rubber, latex, and gelatin pieces smeared in fake blood—the "internal organs" – which could then fall free. The other effect involved Barrymore's character being gutted and hanged by the neck from a tree. The team utilized a similar approach, but replicated Barrymore's entire body, as it would be impossible to conceal her real body and display the special effect of her character having been gutted.

Post-production 
After filming was completed in June 1996, Craven spent two months editing the final product. He encountered repeated conflicts with the Motion Picture Association of America film rating system (MPAA) concerning the content of scenes. He was forced to tone down or obscure the more intense scenes and overall violence to avoid an NC-17 rating, which is considered "box office suicide"—cinemas and retail chains often refused to stock NC-17 titles. Though Dimension had previously released NC-17-rated films, the rating made those films difficult to market and attract an audience. Dimension was desperate for a less-restrictive R rating, but the producers felt the demanded cuts would remove key elements from the film and reduce its quality. The opening scene featuring Barrymore was one of the most difficult parts to process through the MPAA, who required cuts based on its "intensity". Craven lied to the MPAA, claiming he had only one take of the scene and could not replace it with something less intense; the MPAA allowed the scene.

Craven sent eight different cuts of the film to deal with complaints. Problematic scenes included the gutting death of Steve Orth (Walls), where he was required to remove any movement of the character's internal organs; the throat-cutting of Kenny, where he had to trim the end of the scene, as the MPAA felt the actor's pained expression was too "disturbing"; and they had to shorten the length of time spent viewing the crushed head of Tatum Riley. The MPAA still held issue with a scene from the finale, where the killers (Ulrich and Lillard) stab each other, creating large amounts of visible blood. The MPAA required that the blood not be seen in motion—falling to the floor from the body. It seemed unlikely that the film would be able to achieve an R rating without further significant cuts. With the film's release date drawing closer, Bob Weinstein intervened and personally contacted the MPAA. He believed they misunderstood the film and to which genre Scream really belonged, and were focusing too much on the horror elements. Weinstein explained that although he agreed with their assessment that the film was "intense", the film also had comedic elements and satire; it was not just a horror film glorifying violence. The MPAA reviewed their decision; shortly thereafter the film was granted an R rating.

Music 

The Scream score was provided by fledgling composer Marco Beltrami, his first time scoring a feature film. Craven's assistant Julie Plec had requested input on composers who were "new", "fresh", and "wonderful", and was given Beltrami's name by several people. Beltrami was contacted for samples of his work. Craven, impressed by what he heard, requested Beltrami come to the set to view the opening thirteen minutes of the film containing the introduction and the death of Barrymore's character. Beltrami was tasked with scoring a piece of music for this scene, which would be reviewed by the producers and the Weinstein brothers. Beltrami was hired to score the entire film on the basis of this sample. Beltrami had no prior experience scoring a work of horror. Craven and editor Patrick Lussier advised him on how to deliver music that would raise the tension and how to use stings to punctuate the more intense moments. Craven wanted the music to intentionally raise tension during scenes where audience expectations were already raised by their experience of previous horror films. The volume would be raised to indicate that the killer is hiding behind a door, but nothing would be present upon its opening.

Beltrami decided to intentionally disregard conventional horror score styles. He approached the film as a western, taking influence from Ennio Morricone, a prolific composer for many westerns. When scoring a theme for the character of Dewey (Arquette), Beltrami approached him as a "quirky" wild west sheriff, using a Morricone-style guitar accompaniment. Sidney Prescott's theme, titled "Sidney's Lament", features a female choral arrangement expressing "sorrow" concerning the character's situation. Beltrami states that the voice "spoke" for the character, "lamenting" the loss of her mother. Christian Clemmensen of Filmtracks called the "haunting" vocals of the track the "voice of the franchise". The song was used throughout the film's sequels.

Release

Theatrical 
Scream held its premiere on December 18, 1996, at the AMC Avco theater in Westwood, Los Angeles, California. Bob Weinstein ordered that the film be released on December 20, 1996, a date others were critical of as it was the Christmas period where seasonal and family films were more prevalent. Weinstein argued this fact was in the film's favor as it meant that horror fans and teenagers had nothing interesting to watch during the December period. When Screams first weekend takings amounted to only $6million, it was considered that this release date gamble had failed, but the following week, takings did not drop but increased and continued to increase in the following weeks leading to a total U.S. gross of over $100million and high critical praise.

In cooperation with rights holder Paramount Pictures, Fathom Events said it would re-release Scream in theaters for one night on October 10, 2021.

Home media 
Scream was released in the United States on Dolby Digital (AC-3) LaserDisc (uncut) on July 2, 1997, VHS on June 24, 1997, and a special release with the Scream 2 trailer on December 2, 1997, and on DVD on December 3, 1997. A DTS LaserDisc uncut version was released on August 26, 1998, followed by a collector's edition DVD of the film on December 8, 1998, containing the film, the theatrical trailer, cast interviews, a director's commentary, and behind the scenes information. These releases were all undertaken by Buena Vista Home Entertainment. Following the release of Scream 3, Scream and its first two sequels were collected in "The Ultimate Scream Collection" by Buena Vista Home Entertainment on September 26, 2000, a boxset containing the three films and a bonus disc containing "Behind the Scream", a 30-minute documentary about the production of the three films, and additional material, including screentests and outtakes. Scream was also released on LaserDisc in France, Hong Kong, Japan, and the United Kingdom in 1997; and in Germany and as a special edition in Japan in 1998.

Scream remained unreleased on DVD in some foreign territories, including Europe, until 2001. The Japanese DVD was released on December 23, 1998 contained both the R-rated version of the film, plus the original "Director's Cut", which restored the gore/violence removed by the MPAA. Scream was released in Europe with Scream 2 and Scream 3 on February 26 by Buena Vista Home Entertainment. Each package contained additional content found in the Collector's Edition version of the US release, including deleted scenes, outtakes, theatrical trailers, music videos, and crew commentary. The three films were also sold as a collection called the "Scream Trilogy", released on February 26, 2001.

On March 29, 2011, two weeks prior to the release of Scream 4, Scream was released in US territories on Blu-ray by Lionsgate Home Entertainment. The Blu-ray presents the films in 1080p high definition. The releases contain all the additional materials found on the Collector's Edition DVD, but not the material from the boxset bonus disc.

On October 19, 2021, for its 25th anniversary, Paramount released a newly remastered 4K version of the film on Ultra HD Blu-ray. Blu-ray.com praised the new transfer as a significant improvement over the 2011 Blu-ray.

Reception

Box office 
The film opened in 1,413 theaters, taking $6.4million in its opening weekend, opening in second against Beavis and Butt-head Do America, and almost $87million in its initial release. It was re-released to theatres on April 11, 1997, and accrued a further $16.2million for a total domestic gross of $103million. It grossed $70million in other territories for a worldwide lifetime gross of $173million. Scream remains the most successful of the Scream film series, receiving a largely positive critical reception. As of 2013, Scream is currently the 577th highest-grossing movie worldwide. In the United States, without adjusting for inflation, the film is the twentieth highest-grossing horror film, and remained the highest-grossing slasher film until it was surpassed by Halloween (2018), directly followed by Scream 2 and Scream 3. Adjusted for inflation, the film would have doubled its gross to $346million.

Despite competition from other box office fare such as Tom Cruise's Jerry Maguire and Tim Burton's Mars Attacks!, its release during the Christmas season, and Variety labeling it "D.O.A." before it was even released, Scream became the fifteenth highest-grossing film of 1996, well placed amongst big-budget blockbusters released that year such as Independence Day and Mission: Impossible. It was shown in cinemas for nearly eight months after its release.

Critical response 
On review aggregator Rotten Tomatoes, the film holds an approval rating of 80% based on 87 reviews, with an average rating of 7.4/10. The website's critical consensus reads, "Horror icon Wes Craven's subversive deconstruction of the genre is sly, witty, and surprisingly effective as a slasher film itself, even if it's a little too cheeky for some." On Metacritic, the film received a weighted average score of 65 out of 100 based on 25 critics, indicating "generally favorable reviews".

Peter Stack of the San Francisco Chronicle appreciated the shift from the teen slasher films of the 1980s and their "endless series of laborious, half-baked sequels". Kevin Thomas of The Los Angeles Times called Scream "a bravura, provocative sendup of horror pictures" and complimented the film for being "scary and gruesome" while avoiding a sense of "morbidity". Empire Adam Smith called it "Clever, quick and bloody funny". Williamson's script was praised as containing a "fiendishly clever, complicated plot" which "deftly mixes irony, self-reference and wry social commentary with chills and blood spills". Time Out London lauded the film's intelligence and scares, while praising the casting, saying "at last, a horror movie to shout about!" Film4 cited Craven's own Wes Craven's New Nightmare (1994) and its cast of self-aware characters as inspiration for Scream, but declared that while New Nightmare was a "noble failure – pretty smart, but crucially not very scary" that Scream was "not merely clever ... it is, from its breathtaking opening sequence (with Barrymore as the woman in peril) onwards, simply terrifying".

Roger Ebert of the Chicago Sun-Times gave the film a positive review of 3 out of 4 stars, appreciating "the in-jokes and the self-aware characters", but was confused over whether the level of violence was "defused by the ironic way the film uses it and comments on it". The New York Times Janet Maslin was not as appreciative, saying "not much of Scream is that gruesome". She wrote that Craven "wants things both ways, capitalizing on lurid material while undermining it with mocking humor. Not even horror fans who can answer all this film's knowing trivia questions may be fully comfortable with such an exploitative mix." Despite being critical of the film itself, calling it "one experiment that needed more lab time", Variety complimented the "strong" ensemble cast, singling out the performances of Campbell and Ulrich as "charismatic". The BBC claimed that the film had promise, saying "It appeared to be clever, dangerous, witty, and fresh" but went on to label it as derivative of the films it satirized: "Scream runs out of humour, and in turn robs itself of the chance to get the audience to take the thrills and gut-spills it offers seriously."

Accolades 
Scream received several awards and award nominations following its release, including the Saturn Award for Best Actress for Campbell, Best Writing for Kevin Williamson, and Best Horror Film; it received Saturn nominations for Best Director for Wes Craven and Best Supporting Actor for Ulrich and Barrymore. Craven was awarded the Grand Prize at the Gérardmer Film Festival. The film was awarded the 1997 Best Movie by the MTV Movie Awards, while Campbell received a nomination for Best Female Performance.

Albums

Soundtrack 

The Scream original soundtrack was released on December 17, 1996, by TVT Records. The soundtrack features 11 songs—most of which appeared in various scenes in the film—plus a piece from the film's score, "Trouble in Woodsboro" / "Sidney's Lament", by Beltrami. The Alice Cooper version of "School's Out" appeared in the film following the closure of Woodsboro high school, but it was replaced with a cover version of the song by The Last Hard Men on the album. An acoustic cover of Blue Öyster Cult's "Don't Fear the Reaper", performed by Gus Black, plays softly in the background while Sidney and Billy discuss their relationship. The song was also one of the few songs featured in John Carpenter's Halloween, a film to which Scream makes repeated homage. Analyst Jeff Smith describes the musical choice as: 

The song "Red Right Hand" by Nick Cave and the Bad Seeds, heard in the first film, is also used in Scream 2, Scream 3, Scream (2022), and Scream VI. Nick Cave performs a version of the track written specifically for Scream 3 in that film. An alternate version of the music video "Drop Dead Gorgeous" by Republica, featuring clips from the film, was shown on music networks such as MTV. Although the song can be heard in the film, it is only included on the European edition of the soundtrack album. The song was also used in one of the film's television commercials. The soundtrack album was not considered a success, failing to chart on the US Billboard 200. AllMusic awarded the album 3 stars out of 5.

Score 
The Scream score by Marco Beltrami was released by Varèse Sarabande on July 14, 1998, on a CD titled "Scream/Scream 2", which also contained tracks from the score of Scream 2. The release consisted of only six tracks—"Sidney's Lament", "Altered Ego", "A Cruel World", "Trouble in Woodsboro", "Chasing Sidney", and "NC-17"—with a runtime of only 12 minutes, compared to over an hour of music made for the film and the more common 30–45 minutes of music found in other original scores. Some reviewers felt the restricted runtime was a result of the high cost of releasing a composer's music commercially, combined with Varèse Sarabande's unwillingness to pay.

The score to Scream received generally positive reviews, with Mikael Carlsson labeling it as "some of the most intriguing horror scores composed in years". Filmtracks.com claimed the scores had "cult status", awarding it 3 stars out of 5. AllMusic said that the score "perfectly captured the post-modern, hip scare-ride of the Scream movies", also giving it 3 stars out of 5.

Sequels 

Williamson had attached five-page proposals for potential sequels to Scream when he originally sold the script, hoping to entice prospective buyers into buying a film and a franchise. When Dimension Films bought the script, they secured Williamson for two future Scream films, should the original prove successful. After a highly positive test screening of Scream at which executives from Dimension Films and Miramax were present, Craven was signed to direct the two sequels. After the film's box office and critical success, the first sequel was greenlit and sent into production while Scream was still in theaters. The second picture was given an increased budget. The surviving cast—Campbell, Cox, Arquette, Kennedy, and Schreiber—all returned, as well as much of the original crew, including editor Patrick Lussier and composer Marco Beltrami. A third film followed shortly after, again with the crew and surviving cast returning to create what was, at the time, the concluding film in the Scream trilogy. The three original films, released in a five-year period, followed the story of Sidney Prescott's encounters with a succession of killers adopting the Ghostface disguise. The films also analyze her relationship with her deceased mother, who inadvertently initiates the events depicted in the films. Scream 2 fared as well financially and critically as its predecessor, while Scream 3 fared significantly worse on both counts, with critics deriding the film as having become what the original had so deftly satirized.

Fifteen years after the release of Scream and eleven years after the release of the last film in the series, The Weinstein Company released a new sequel, Scream 4, in April 2011. Campbell, Cox and Arquette all returned to their roles, and Craven, Williamson, and Beltrami returned to the production side. The Weinstein Company stated that the success of Scream 4 could have led to potential sequels and a new Scream trilogy, with Campbell, Arquette, Craven, and Williamson all having been contracted or expressed interest in appearing in future installments.

A fifth Scream film was released in January 2022, with Matt Bettinelli-Olpin and Tyler Gillett directing and Kevin Williamson producing. Neve Campbell reprised her role as Sidney Prescott in the film, along with Courteney Cox, David Arquette and Skeet Ulrich.

Controversies 
In the years following the release of Scream, the film has been accused of inspiring copycat crimes and inducing violent acts.

In January 1998, 16-year-old Mario Padilla and his 14-year-old cousin, Samuel Ramirez, stabbed Mario's mother, Gina Castillo, 45 times, killing her. The case became known as the "Scream murder" and fell under intense media scrutiny after the boys claimed they were inspired by Scream and Scream 2. The pair confessed to needing the money acquired from Gina's murder to fund a killing spree, which would include purchasing two Ghostface costumes, as well as a voice-changer used by the characters in the films. During their trial, Madeline Levine, a psychologist who studied the effect of violence on children, stated, "There were a whole bunch of reasons why they acted out that way. But did the movie provide a blueprint? Absolutely." The case was expected to highlight the effect of violent films on teenagers. However, presiding judge John Cheroske ordered that evidence pertaining to Scream be barred and that the case not be referred to as the "Scream murder", refusing media access to the courtroom, intending that the case be tried as murder and nothing else.

On January 17, 1999, 13-year-old Ashley Murray was stabbed multiple times in the head and back before being left for dead by his friends Daniel Gill, 14, and Robert Fuller, 15. He was later found and saved by an elderly man walking his dog. The pair were dubbed the "Scream attackers" after it emerged that they had watched Scream shortly before the attack and drawings of the Ghostface mask were found among their possessions. Their actions were additionally blamed on physical abuse, drugs and exposure to black magic in their home life. Murray, who later testified against the pair, stated that he believed the film may have influenced the pair to attack him.

On May 4, 1999, following the Columbine High School massacre and increasing news media reports on the effects of violent films, games, and other media on society, the United States Senate Commerce committee held a hearing about Hollywood's marketing of films to youths. The committee focused specifically on horror films. The opening scene of Scream, featuring the murder of Casey Becker, was shown to the committee as an example of negative media which may be viewed by children.

On June 3, 2002, a 17-year-old boy lured his friend, 15-year-old Alice Beaupère, out of her parents' house in Saint-Sébastien-sur-Loire, France, and stabbed her 42 times while wearing a Ghostface mask. He ran away when he saw a neighbor approaching, and the girl told the neighbor the name of her attacker before she died from her injuries. After being arrested, the boy told police that he had wanted to kill someone to emulate the Ghostface character from Scream.

Legacy 
Prior to Screams release, the popularity of the horror genre had been considered to be in decline, with many films released straight-to-video while those released in cinemas were sequels to popular and established franchises, such as Psycho, The Texas Chainsaw Massacre, Halloween, Friday the 13th, and A Nightmare on Elm Street, capable of drawing audiences despite decreasing budgets and diminishing critical reception. The glut of sequels contributed to audience familiarity with the icons of the late 1970s and early 1980s, such as Freddy Krueger and Jason Voorhees, and that familiarity was considered to have dampened their ability to instill fear or interest in their audiences. Scream, utilizing a popular and attractive cast and an innovative script that both mocked and embraced the conventions of horror which had become considered clichéd, was credited with changing the status of the genre, becoming both a financial and critical success, and launching the careers of many of its actors. Such was the film's impact that some commentators considered its legacy as the creation of a distinct era of "post-Scream" horror films. Following its release, many studios, including Screams own Dimension Films, rushed to capitalize on its unexpected success with the release of films such as I Know What You Did Last Summer (1997), Urban Legend (1998) and Cherry Falls (2000), as well as sequels to popular, but diminishing, franchises such as Halloween H20: 20 Years Later and Bride of Chucky.

Much of the humor of the 2000 film Scary Movie relies upon specific references to other contemporary films. Roger Ebert remarked in his review that "to get your money's worth, you need to be familiar with the various teenage horror franchises." The two films on which the script is most heavily based are Scream and I Know What You Did Last Summer (1997), utilizing the general narrative arcs of both films, and featuring comedic recreations of key scenes. The backstory in which the teenagers are responsible for accidentally killing a man following a beauty pageant recalls the same plot point in I Know What You Did Last Summer. Major references to Scream include the identity of Ghostface and the murder of Drew Decker in the opening scene, a reference to the opening scene of Scream in which the same thing occurs to the character played by Drew Barrymore. Additionally, the characters of Scream and I Know What You Did Last Summer are heavily mirrored in the film, and the title Scary Movie was originally the working title for the project that would eventually become Scream.

In June 2001, as part of the American Film Institute's AFI 100 Years ... series, Scream became one of the 400 nominees in the 100 Years ... 100 Thrills category. In 2003, the character Ghostface was nominated in the "Villains" category 100 Heroes and Villains. In 2005, "Do you like scary movies?", as spoken by Roger Jackson, was nominated for AFI's 100 Years ... 100 Movie Quotes, a list of the greatest cinematic quotes.

Scream ranks #32 on Entertainment Weekly list of the "50 Best High School Movies", and the opening scene featuring the death of Barrymore's character ranked No. 13 on Bravo's 100 Scariest Movie Moments. In 2008, Entertainment Weekly dubbed the film a "New Classic" by ranking it #60 in their list of the "100 Best Films of the Last 13 years". In 2008 Empire ranked the film #482 on their list of "The 500 Greatest Movies of All Time". In 2016, Empire ranked the film #3 on their list of the greatest horror films of all time.

See also 
 List of films featuring home invasions

References

External links 

 
 
 
 
 
 

1
1996 films
1996 horror films
1996 independent films
1996 thriller films
1990s American films
1990s English-language films
1990s high school films
1990s horror thriller films
1990s mystery thriller films
1990s satirical films
1990s serial killer films
1990s slasher films
1990s teen horror films
American high school films
American horror thriller films
American independent films
American mystery horror films
American mystery thriller films
American satirical films
American serial killer films
American slasher films
American teen horror films
Dimension Films films
Films directed by Wes Craven
Films produced by Cathy Konrad
Films scored by Marco Beltrami
Films set in 1996
Films set in California
Films shot in California
Films with screenplays by Kevin Williamson
Home invasions in film
Metafictional works
Miramax films